Sergei Martynov may refer to:

 Sergey Martynov (archer) (born 1965), Kazakh archer
 Sergei Martynov (politician) (born 1953), former Belarusian Minister for Foreign Affairs
 Sergei Martynov (serial killer), Russian serial killer accused of killing nine women between 1992 and 2010
 Sergei Martynov (sport shooter) (born 1968), Belarusian rifle shooter
 Sergey Martynov (wrestler) (1971–1997), Russian Greco-Roman wrestler